Charles Cruft may refer to:

Charles Cruft (general) (1826–1883), Union General during the American Civil War
Charles Cruft (showman) (1852–1938), English dog show organizer